Mank is a 2020 American black-and-white biographical drama film about screenwriter Herman J. Mankiewicz and his development of the screenplay for Citizen Kane (1941). It was directed by David Fincher based on a screenplay by his late father Jack Fincher and was produced by Ceán Chaffin, Douglas Urbanski, and Eric Roth. It stars Gary Oldman in the title role, alongside Amanda Seyfried, Lily Collins, Arliss Howard, Tom Pelphrey, Sam Troughton, Ferdinand Kingsley, Tuppence Middleton, Tom Burke, Joseph Cross, Jamie McShane, Toby Leonard Moore, Monika Gossman, and Charles Dance.

Jack Fincher wrote the script in the 1990s, and David originally intended to film it after he completed The Game (1997), with Kevin Spacey and Jodie Foster as the leads. It never came to fruition, and Jack Fincher died in 2003. Eventually, the project was officially announced in July 2019, and filming took place around Los Angeles from November 2019 to February 2020. To pay homage to the films of the 1930s, Mank was shot in black-and-white using RED cameras.

Mank had a limited theatrical release on November 13, 2020 and began streaming on Netflix on December 4. The film received positive reviews from critics, who praised Fincher's direction, as well as the acting (particularly Oldman and Seyfried), cinematography, production values, and musical score. The film earned a leading ten nominations at the 93rd Academy Awards, including Best Picture, Best Director, Best Actor (Oldman), and Best Supporting Actress (Seyfried), and won for Best Production Design and Best Cinematography. It also  received a leading six nominations at the 78th Golden Globe Awards, including Best Motion Picture – Drama.

Plot

In 1940, Orson Welles is given complete creative freedom for his next project by RKO. For the screenplay, Welles recruits Herman J. Mankiewicz, who is in Victorville, California, recovering from a broken leg he sustained in a car crash. Herman dictates the script to his secretary, Rita Alexander, who notices similarities between the main character (Charles Foster Kane) and William Randolph Hearst. Producer John Houseman is concerned about Herman's dense, nonlinear screenplay, while Herman's brother Joseph worries that it may anger the powerful Hearst.

In 1930, Herman visits an MGM location where he and the female lead, Marion Davies, recognize each other. She introduces him to Hearst, her benefactor and lover, who takes a liking to Herman. In 1933, Herman and his wife Sara attend Louis B. Mayer's birthday party at Hearst Castle with many Hollywood bigwigs. They discuss the rise of Nazi Germany and the upcoming gubernatorial election, in particular candidate Upton Sinclair. Herman and Marion go for a stroll, where they bond over discussions on politics and the film industry.

In 1940, Houseman grows impatient over Herman's lack of progress. Rita is also concerned with the timing of the writing and Herman's alcoholism. He does finish the screenplay in time. Houseman is impressed but reminds Herman that he will receive no credit for his work.

In 1934, Herman and Joseph begin working at MGM under Mayer. Studio executives, including Irving Thalberg, actively work against Sinclair's gubernatorial campaign. The studio produces propaganda films for a smear campaign, funded by Hearst, against Sinclair. Herman approaches Marion to pull the films but is unsuccessful as she has already left the studio for Warner Bros. Herman and Sara later attend an election night watch party at the Trocadero Nightclub, where Mayer announces the winner, Frank Merriam. Herman's colleague, director Shelly Metcalf, shoots and kills himself after being diagnosed with Parkinson's disease and guilt-ridden over his role in the smear campaign, despite personally supporting Sinclair.

In 1940, Charles Lederer picks up the screenplay from Herman to deliver to the studio. Joseph visits Herman after reading it, warning him of Hearst's reaction and how it might affect Marion. He does, however, believe that it is the finest thing Herman has ever written. Marion also visits and does her best to persuade Herman to change the screenplay but to no avail. She tells Herman she will try to stop the picture from getting made.

In 1937, Herman crashes a party at Hearst Castle, where he drunkenly pitches the idea for the film he will later write, offending everyone present, including Hearst, Mayer, and Marion. An enraged Mayer reveals that Herman is on Hearst's payroll and calls him a court jester. Hearst tells him an allegory about a monkey and an organ grinder and sees him out.

In 1940, despite pressure from Hearst, Welles is determined to make the film and intends to do a re-write without Herman. He visits Herman and offers him a buyout from the studio. However, reneging on the terms of his contract, Herman requests credit for the script, declaring it his greatest work. An upset Welles tells Herman that he has gone to bat for him before leaving angrily. Herman ultimately receives joint credit with Welles, and they win the Academy Award for Best Original Screenplay for the film (Citizen Kane) two years later.

Cast

 Gary Oldman as Herman J. Mankiewicz
 Amanda Seyfried as Marion Davies
 Lily Collins as Rita Alexander, Herman's secretary, from whom another character, Susan Alexander Kane gets her name.
 Arliss Howard as Louis B. Mayer
 Tom Pelphrey as Joseph L. Mankiewicz
 Charles Dance as William Randolph Hearst
 Sam Troughton as John Houseman
 Ferdinand Kingsley as Irving Thalberg
 Tuppence Middleton as Sara Mankiewicz
 Tom Burke as Orson Welles
 Joseph Cross as Charles Lederer
 Jamie McShane as "Shelly Metcalf", test shot director and Herman's friend. Although Metcalf is fictional, Felix E. Feist was the test shot director at MGM, who shot the propaganda films against Upton Sinclair that Metcalf shoots in Mank.
 Toby Leonard Moore as David O. Selznick
 Monika Gossmann as Fräulein Frieda, Herman's housekeeper
 Leven Rambin as Eve Metcalf, Shelly's wife (fictional character)
 Bill Nye as Upton Sinclair
 Jeff Harms as Ben Hecht
 Craig Robert Young as Charlie Chaplin
  Ali Axelrad  as Starlet #3  

Many other Hollywood icons are portrayed, including Dolores del Río, George S. Kaufman, Greta Garbo, Josef von Sternberg, Norma Shearer, Eleanor Boardman, Joan Crawford, Geraldine Fitzgerald, Billie Dove, Rexford Tugwell, Bette Davis, Clark Gable, Charles MacArthur, Darryl F. Zanuck, S. J. Perelman, Carole Lombard, and Eddie Cantor.

Production

Development
Mank was officially announced in July 2019, when David Fincher said he would direct the film, with Gary Oldman set to star. The screenplay was written by Fincher's father, Jack Fincher, prior to his death in 2003. It was originally going to be Fincher's follow-up to The Game (1997) with Kevin Spacey and Jodie Foster set to star but never came to fruition due to Fincher's insistence on shooting in black-and-white. Additional casting was announced in October, with Amanda Seyfried, Lily Collins, Tuppence Middleton, Arliss Howard, and Charles Dance among the new cast added.

Fincher reunites with much of his usual filmmaking team, including production designer Donald Graham Burt, editor Kirk Baxter, and composers Trent Reznor and Atticus Ross, using only period-authentic instruments. Fincher opted for cinematographer Erik Messerschmidt, with whom he worked on his Netflix series Mindhunter.

Writing
The 120-page draft of the initial script revealed that Jack Fincher closely followed a claim voiced by Pauline Kael in her 1971 New Yorker article "Raising Kane" that Welles did not deserve screenwriting credit. The article angered many critics, including Welles's friend and fellow filmmaker Peter Bogdanovich who rebutted Kael's claims point by point in "The Kane Mutiny", an October 1972 article for Esquire. Her argument was discredited by several film scholars through the years, including Robert L. Carringer in his study of "The Scripts of Citizen Kane."

Many current academics and critics were sparked to action by Mank'''s many-times over debunked premise that the script was Mankiewicz's alone, including NY Times writer Ben Kenigsberg, and Jonathan Rosenbaum, editor of the Welles-Bogdanovich book This Is Orson Welles, who wrote "...Finchers Senior and Junior, willing and eager to accept and further spread Kael’s inaccurate assertion that Herman J. Mankiewicz was the only screenwriter on Citizen Kane, not bothering to research the matter."Mank producer Eric Roth reportedly polished the script prior to filming, with David Fincher saying he felt early drafts were too anti-Welles. When asked about the controversy surrounding authorship, Fincher stated that his movie does not aim to settle the issue: "It was not my interest to make a movie about a posthumous credit arbitration. I was interested in making a movie about a man who agreed not to take any credit. And who then changed his mind. That was interesting to me."

Filming
Filming began on November 1, 2019, in Los Angeles. It also took place in Victorville, California, and wrapped on February 4, 2020. The film was shot in black and white on Fincher's preferred RED digital camera and made reference to the aesthetics of Citizen Kane cinematographer Gregg Toland. Dance stated that a scene involving a drunken Mankiewicz took over 100 takes, while Seyfried said that one of her scenes took over a week and 200 takes to shoot. She stated, "It does feel like Groundhog Day, in a way, but that's how [Fincher] captures things that most people don't." The moonlight stroll between Mankiewicz and Davies was filmed at Huntington Gardens and a Pasadena mansion during the day, although it takes place at night. This was done using the day for night technique. Shooting it during the day was necessary for the lighting Messerschmidt needed for the scene.

Costume design
For designing the costumes, costume designer Trish Summerville and production designer Donald Graham Burt used the noir and monochromatic filters on their iPhones to see how they would look in black and white. Because the film was shot in black and white and not converted afterwards, it meant Summerville had to pick colors that would pop. She looked at photos from 1930s Hollywood to see what was worn at the time.

Music

Fincher's frequent collaborators Trent Reznor and Atticus Ross composed the score for Mank. Forgoing their usual synth-heavy style, Reznor and Ross used period-authentic instrumentation from the 1940s to accompany the film. As a result of the COVID-19 pandemic, each member of the orchestra recorded their sections for the score from home. The entire soundtrack is composed of songs written and performed by Reznor and Ross and runs for 52 tracks at over an hour and a half, and was released by The Null Corporation on December 4, 2020, the same day coinciding with the film's release. An extended soundtrack (featuring unreleased music and demos not featured in the film) that runs over three hours with 87 tracks, was released through Bandcamp the following week, December 11.

ReleaseMank was released in a limited theatrical release in the United States on November 13, 2020, before beginning to stream worldwide on Netflix on December 4, 2020.

IndieWire reported the film played in 75 theaters during its opening weekend and did "similar business" as other new indie releases The Climb and Ammonite, which each averaged about $300 per venue (which would mean a $22,500 debut for Mank). Upon the film's release onto Netflix, it only managed to finish in the top-10 on its first day. IndieWire wrote that it just "didn't gain the attention of other high-profile originals like Da 5 Bloods, The Trial of the Chicago 7, and Hillbilly Elegy," all of which debuted in first or second place.

 Reception 
 Critical response 

The site's critics consensus reads: "Sharply written and brilliantly performed, Mank peers behind the scenes of Citizen Kane to tell an old Hollywood story that could end up being a classic in its own right." According to Metacritic, which compiled 52 reviews and calculated a weighted average score of 79 out of 100, the film received "generally favorable reviews".

Eric Kohn of IndieWire gave the film a "B+" and wrote: "However much credit Mankiewicz deserves for Kane, Fincher's remarkable movie makes a compelling argument for appreciating the prescience behind its conception. His life had a rough ending, but the movie about it gives him one last bitter laugh." Writing for the Los Angeles Times, Justin Chang said, "Mank demands your surrender, but also your heightened attention. It's a pleasurably discombobulating experience, sometimes playing like mordant drawing-room comedy and sometimes flirting with expressionist nightmare, as when Welles' dark silhouette looms over a bedridden Mank and his mummified leg."

Owen Gleiberman of Variety praised the performances and production design, saying, "Mank is a tale of Old Hollywood that's more steeped in Old Hollywood – its glamour and sleaze, its layer-cake hierarchies, its corruption and glory – than just about any movie you've seen, and the effect is to lend it a dizzying time-machine splendor." Peter Travers, reviewing the film for ABC News, wrote: "Mank is the most gorgeous piece of cinema you'll see anywhere. Brilliantly shot in black-and-white by Erik Messerschmidt, with costumes to die for by Trish Summerville and a period-authentic score by Trent Reznor and Atticus Ross that somehow isn't defeated by the retro mono sound, Mank is meant to match the look and feel of its era, as if it's eight decades ago and you just bought a ticket."

Jason Bailey of The Playlist was more mixed and gave the film a "C+" grade, calling it a "gorgeously mounted but ultimately distant biopic". The A.V. Club's Ignatiy Vishnevetsky thought it was "conventional to a fault", writing that parts of the film "bear an uncanny resemblance to the kind of awards-bait middlebrow drama usually essayed by BBC-trained hacks."Mank appeared on 50 critics' year-end top-10 lists, including four first-place rankings and five second place ones.

 Accolades 

See also
 RKO 281, a 1999 HBO film based on the 1996 Oscar-nominated documentary The Battle Over Citizen Kane.

References

External links
 
 
 
 Mank at History vs. Hollywood''
 Script 

2020 films
2020 drama films
2020 biographical drama films
American black-and-white films
American biographical drama films
American nonlinear narrative films
Citizen Kane
Films about alcoholism
Films about films
Films about Hollywood, Los Angeles
Films about screenwriters
Films about Orson Welles
Films directed by David Fincher
Films scored by Trent Reznor
Films scored by Atticus Ross
Films set in the 1930s
Films set in the 1940s
Films set in Los Angeles
Films shot in Los Angeles
Mankiewicz family
English-language Netflix original films
Films whose art director won the Best Art Direction Academy Award
Films whose cinematographer won the Best Cinematography Academy Award
2020s English-language films
1940s English-language films
2020s American films
Cultural depictions of Orson Welles
Cultural depictions of William Randolph Hearst
Cultural depictions of Charlie Chaplin